Yousra Ben Jemaa (born August 22, 1986) is a Paralympian athlete from Tunisia competing mainly in category F32-34/51-53 throwing events.

She competed in the 2008 Summer Paralympics in Beijing, China. There she won a bronze medal in the women's F32-34/51-53 discus throw event.  She also competed in the women's F33/34/42/53 javelin throw and women's F32-34/52/53 shot put.

References

External links 
 

Paralympic athletes of Tunisia
Athletes (track and field) at the 2008 Summer Paralympics
Paralympic bronze medalists for Tunisia
Living people
Athletes (track and field) at the 2012 Summer Paralympics
1986 births
Tunisian female javelin throwers
Tunisian female discus throwers
Tunisian female shot putters
Medalists at the 2008 Summer Paralympics
Paralympic medalists in athletics (track and field)
20th-century Tunisian women
21st-century Tunisian women
African Games gold medalists for Tunisia
African Games medalists in athletics (track and field)
Athletes (track and field) at the 2011 All-Africa Games